KLDK is a low-power radio station ("96.5 on your FM dial") located in Dixon, New Mexico.  KLDK is run entirely by a volunteer staff and is funded primarily through fund-raisers.  KLDK's license is held by the Embudo Valley Library. On December 20, 2005, KLDK completed its first year of broadcasting.  KLDK features a wide variety of Spanish and Anglo programming.

KLDK also frequently features out-of-town guest DJs such as Lola from Lafayette, Indiana.

A new addition to the KLDK lineup is local business leader Michael Gemetta, general manager of Michael's MiniMart in Velarde.

See also
 List of radio stations in New Mexico

External links
 

LDK-LP
LDK-LP
Community radio stations in the United States